= House of Skaramangi =

- Дом Скараманги (Russian)
- Interactive map of the House of Skaramangi area

General information
- Coordinates: 47°12′44″N 38°56′01″E
- Demolished: 21st century

The House of Skaramangi (Russian: Дом Скараманги) was a historical structure on Petrovsky Street in the city of Taganrog in the Rostov Oblast.

== History and description ==
Luka Petrovich Skaramanga built a single-story house at 53 Petrovsky Street in the early 1800s. In 1834, Skaramanga was a member of a local commission to improve the condition of the harbor and the related embankment.

From 1873 to 1880, the house was owned by the merchant Ivan Amvrosiyevich Skaramanga, who owned a brick manufacturing company.

In 1890, the house belonged to Ivan Skaramanga, who was married to Virginia Mikhaelovna. They had three daughters (Elizabeth, Maria and Virginia) and three sons (Ambrose, Mikhail and Panteleymon). The Skaramanga family's wealth grew, and they bought houses at 95 and 97 Grecheskaya Street, in Petrovsky Street, and at the Merchant exchange.

Other documents suggest 53 Petrovsky Street could be related to the Greek office Skaramanga, Manusi which was closed in 1893. This business imported tea, coffee, citrus fruits and exported wheat, cake, and vegetable oils.

In 1898, documents show the house was owned by Virginia, the widow of Ivan.

In 1923, the house became an orphanage, which was demolished in the 21st century.
